The finger gun is a hand gesture in which a person uses their hand to mimic a handgun, raising their thumb above their fist to act as a hammer, and one or two fingers extended perpendicular to it acting as a barrel. The middle finger can also act as the trigger finger or part of the barrel itself. Also, an optional clicking of the fingers or making firing sounds with the mouth can be included when forming the "gun" as to emphasise the gesture. The gesture can be intended to be a threat, or simply a friendly gesture.

Variations
It is also sometimes used by placing the “gun” to the side of one's own head, in one's mouth, or under the chin, as if committing suicide, to indicate a strong desire to be put out of one's misery, either from boredom or exasperation, or to express one's dislike for a situation. It can be used as an insulting gesture, as to suggest that another person's brain should be blown out of the back of their head.

Another form is the combination of two hands to express a greeting, or to acknowledge something as funny, clever, or insightful, like Gotcha! or What's up?.

Laws and rulings
In 2019, the Superior Court of Pennsylvania ruled that using a “gun-like hand gesture”, "imitating the firing and recoiling of a gun" as intimidation, is a crime of disorderly conduct.

In schools
Children, teenagers and teacher's assistants have occasionally been punished or removed from school for making the gesture. In some cases, this was because authority figures interpreted it as a signal for threatening real violence, while in others they interpreted it as unacceptably supportive of gun violence in general.  These have often been labeled as “ridiculous” by some commentators.

In 2006, Fahim Ahmad allegedly made the gesture when speaking about the possibility of Canadian Security Intelligence Service agents coming to his apartment, which was used as evidence of his conspiracy to commit terrorism by a police informant.

Politics

Brazil 
The President of Brazil Jair Bolsonaro usually makes the finger gun gesture alluding to his ideas of changing the gun control laws to make weapons more accessible to the regular citizen. This gesture became a symbol of the Bolsonarism, being used by supporters of the ideology.

On 27 September 2019, deputy Eduardo Bolsonaro (PSL) posed for a photo in front of the Non-Violence sculpture at the United Nations headquarters in New York City making the finger gun gesture.

In movies and TV 

In cinema, the gesture has been used extensively, often for comedic effect, and two well-known cases are those in the Italian film Where Are You Going on Holiday? in 1978, in which it is done by the character played by Elisabetta Pozzi, and in the 1985 film The Breakfast Club, in which it is used by actress Ally Sheedy. Additional examples include The Losers, The Expendables 2, Crank, Taxi Driver, Gran Torino, Reservoir Dogs, Ferris Bueller's Day Off, Spring Breakers, Better Call Saul, and Scott Pilgrim vs. The World. The finger gun is used multiple times by the titular character from the TV series Veronica Mars. It is also famously used in both UK and US versions of The Office.

References

Fingers
Firearms
Hand gestures